Grushevo is a rural locality (a selo) in Novotuzukleysky Selsoviet, Kamyzyaksky District, Astrakhan Oblast, Russia. The population was 400 as of 2010. There are 3 streets.

Geography 
Grushevo is located 53 km east of Kamyzyak (the district's administrative centre) by road. Sizova Griva is the nearest rural locality.

References 

Rural localities in Kamyzyaksky District